Tsuen Wan District is one of the 18 districts of Hong Kong. It is located in the New Territories and is served by the Tsuen Wan line of the MTR metro system. Its area is 60,7 km². Its residents, who mostly live in Tsuen Wan Town, enjoy the highest income in the New Territories.

Part of the Tsuen Wan New Town is located in the Tsuen Wan District. An exclave of Tsuen Wan is also located on the northeastern part of Lantau island.

The Hong Kong Disneyland Resort is within the boundary of Tsuen Wan District.

History
The district was set up in 1982 covering the present-day Tsuen Wan District and Kwai Tsing District. Kwai Chung and the island of Tsing Yi were split from Tsuen Wan District in the mid-1980s, and subsequently formed a new district known as Kwai Tsing.

Sights

The Sam Tung Uk Museum is a cultural and agricultural museum and was set up in a former Hakka walled village. Behind Tsuen Wan is Shing Mun reservoir, a valley that was once home to 10 villages that grew mostly pineapples. The dam that stops the reservoir is called Po Lo Pa, lit. pineapple dam. There were once disputes and fights among the Shing Mun Valley dwellers and Tsuen Wan residents during the 18th century, over the levying of taxes for pineapple sales. The reservoir valley also has a disused lead mine, where some of the residents of Tsuen Wan used to work. Behind this is Tai Mo Shan, the tallest hill in Hong Kong.

Islands
The following islands of Hong Kong are administratively part of the district:
 Cheung Sok
 Ma Wan
 Ngam Hau Shek
 Pun Shan Shek
 Tang Lung Chau
 Northeastern part of Lantau Island

Education

Transportation

MTR
 Tsuen Wan line of the MTR metro system. Tsuen Wan station is the terminus of the line. Tai Wo Hau station is also at Tsuen Wan District.
 Tuen Ma line also has a station at the coastal area of Tsuen Wan Town, named Tsuen Wan West station.
 Disneyland Resort line operates within the district, in the northern part of Lantau Island, consisting Sunny Bay station and Disneyland Resort station.

Bus
There are also tens of bus routes serving Tsuen Wan, mostly operated by Kowloon Motor Bus. Citybus also operates a few.

Park Island Transport Co., Ltd. operates bus services between Park Island on Ma Wan and Tsing Yi MTR station, Park Island and Kwai Fong Metroplaza, Park Island and Hong Kong International Airport; Park Island and Tsuen Wan (close to the Tsuen Wan MTR station).

Ferry
Park Island Transport Co., Ltd. operates ferry services between Park Island on Ma Wan and Central and between Park Island and Tsuen Wan Pier (next to the Tsuen Wan West MTR station).

See also
 List of areas of Hong Kong

Further reading

 Chinese University of Hong Kong. Traffic and Industrial Noise Problems in Tsuen Wan for Tsuen Wan District Board (Full Report). Hong Kong: Tsuen Wan Provisional District Board, 1997. 
 Chow, Wing-sun, Nelson. A Study of the Values, Leisure, Behaviour and Misbehaviour of the Youth in Tsuen Wan and Kwai Chung. [Hong Kong]: The Board, 1985. 
 Hong Kong. Report of the Working Group on Pollution Problems in Tsuen Wan. Hong Kong: Govt. Printer, 1988. 
 Hong Kong. Report on Religious Cult Activities in Tsuen Wan & Kwai Chung. Hong Kong: The Board, 1982. 
 Hong Kong. Tsuen Wan District Board. [Hong Kong]: The Board, 1981. 
 Hong Kong. Survey of Chinese Historic Rural Architecture in Tsuen Wan District, New Territories, July - August, 1980. [Hong Kong: The Section, 1980. 
 Hong Kong. Tsuen Wan and District Outline Development Plan. Hong Kong: Govt. Printer, 1969. 
 Lam, Kin-che. Tsuen Wan Tourism Development & Promotion Strategy. [Hong Kong: Centre for Environmental Policy and Resource Management, the Chinese University of Hong Kong, 2002. 
 Ng, Sek-hong. A Report on the Survey on the Conditions of Work for Female Workers in Tsuen Wan, 1986. [Hong Kong]: Tsuen Wan District Board, 1987. 
 Tsuen Wan Arts Festival. Opening of the Third Tsuen Wan Arts Festival: Dance Drama 'Life of the Li Tribe'. Hong Kong: Govt. Printer, 1981.

References

External links

 Tsuen Wan District Council
 List and map of electoral constituencies (large PDF file)
 Tsuen Wan New Town